Rock Island–Milan School District No. 41 is a unit school district in the Rock Island and Milan areas of the Quad Cities (Illinois).

History
The public schools in Rock Island existed prior to 1857, organized as five grade school districts, each with its own board and taxes, and each represented on a Union High School board.  The system, including the board of township school trustees, was replaced by organizing a single Rock Island School District under a state charter issued on February 18, 1857, and including all of fractional Township 18 North, Range 2 West of the Fourth Principal Meridian plus all of the city of Rock Island, and providing that the district would annex any territory annexed into the city of Rock Island or requested by a three quarters of the voters in a territory.

Schools
The Rock Island–Milan School District is currently home to thirteen schools. One high school, two junior high schools, nine elementary schools, and one alternative education center.

High school
 Rock Island Senior High

Junior High schools
 Edison Junior High
 Washington Junior High

Elementary schools
 Earl Hanson Elementary
 Eugene Field Elementary
 Ridgewood Elementary
 Denkmann Elementary
 Longfellow Elementary
 Francis Willard Elementary
 Thomas Jefferson Elementary
 Rock Island Academy
 Rock Island Center for Math and Science (newly built circa 2010)

Other schools
 S.K.I.P. and E.D.R. at the Horace Mann Early Learning Center (day care, preschool, special education)
 Thurgood Marshall Learning Center

See also
 List of school districts in Illinois

References

External links
 
  — official website before 2017 (archived)

School districts in Illinois
Education in Rock Island County, Illinois
1857 establishments in Illinois
School districts established in 1857